Petar Pekić (Felsőszentiván, Kingdom of Hungary, 1896 – 1965) was a Hungarian-Croatian historian, Slavist and writer from Bácska (Bačka).

The quality of his works opened him the place in the Geza Kikić's anthology of prose and poetry of Bunjevci Croats.

Petar Pekić was also an important person in politics. As a Bunjevci Croat from southern Hungary, he  participated at the Paris Peace Conference on September 22, 1919, as a part of the Bunjevci Croat mission.

Works 
translations
Voltaire: Moj boravak u Berlinu, 1951.
historical
Povijest oslobođenja Vojvodine, Grafika, Subotica, 1939
Vae victis : ili pobijanje kritike dra Dušana Popovića i Vase Stajića, Subotica, 1930
Propast Austro-Ugarske Monarhije : i postanak nasljednih država, Grafika, Subotica, 1937
Povijest Hrvata u Vojvodini : od najstarijih vremena do 1929. godine, Matica hrvatska, Zagreb, 1930

Sources 
 Geza Kikić: Antologija proze bunjevačkih Hrvata, Matica Hrvatska, Zagreb, 1971
 Geza Kikić: Antologija poezije bunjevačkih Hrvata, Matica Hrvatska, Zagreb, 1971
 Milovan Miković: ''Roman u književnosti Hrvata u Vojvodini - antologija, Osijek, 2008.

External links 
 Eötvös József Főiskola, Baja Nemzetiségi referens felsőfokú szakképzési program - A horvát kisebbség irodalma I.II.III.
 Antologija proze bunjevačkih Hrvata
 Antologija poezije bunjevačkih Hrvata
 Zvonik Kojim je jezikom govorio Blaško Rajić (old link, currently unavailable)
 Hrvatska riječ Roman u književnosti vojvođanskih Hrvata, 13. veljače 2009.

1896 births
1965 deaths
Croatian novelists
Male novelists
Croatian male poets
20th-century Croatian historians
Hungarian people of Croatian descent
20th-century Croatian poets
20th-century novelists
20th-century male writers
Bunjevci
Croats of Vojvodina